= House of Simonovich =

- Дом Симоновича
- Location: Taganrog, Chekhov Street, 30
- Coordinates: 47°12′21″N 38°56′17″E

The House of Simonovich (Russian: Дом Симоновича) is an historic Russian building inhabiting Chekhova Street in Taganrog, Rostov Oblast. The structure is subject to preservation and restoration.

== History ==
The merchant Chilikin built the new house after the 1850s. He owned it until the 1890s, when he sold to Rostov merchant Markus Gordon. In 1906 the house changed owners, when Logachev purchased it. From 1915 to 1918 Simonovich for whom the building became known owned the house. He leased it to the District police. In some rooms, the district committee on land affairs was located, while a printing house worked in others. In the 21st century, it again became a house.

== Design ==
The house is two-storeyed, constructed of a stone. The porch with an openwork canopy settles down not on the center — is displaced to the right. The corner of the house is rounded, over it, there is an original pediment. The Nadokonny space is decorated by different elements of decor.
